Spooner Row is a small village, and civil parish, in the English county of Norfolk. The village was within the civil parish of Wymondham before separating on 1 April 2019.

Spooner Row railway station, in the village, is served by local services operated by Greater Anglia on the Breckland Line from Norwich to Cambridge. However, weekday services are limited to two morning trains to Norwich and one early evening train to Cambridge. On Saturdays, there is only one train to Norwich and the westbound service is extended to Stansted Airport. There is no service on Sundays. The station is a request stop.

References

External links

Villages in Norfolk
South Norfolk
Civil parishes in Norfolk